Thomas James Conaty (August 1, 1847 – September 18, 1915) was an American prelate of the Catholic Church. He served as rector of the Catholic University of America (1896-1903) and Bishop of Monterey-Los Angeles (1903-1915).

Early life and education
Thomas Conaty was born on August 1, 1847 in Kilnaleck, County Cavan, the eldest of eight children of Patrick and Alice (née Lynch) Conaty. The family came to the United States in May 1850 and settled in Taunton, Massachusetts, where Conaty's father had lived from 1831 to 1839 before returning to Ireland.

After receiving his early education in the public schools of Taunton, Conaty entered the Collège de Montréal in December 1863. He remained there for three years and enrolled at the College of the Holy Cross in Worcester in September 1867, graduating two years later. He then returned to Montreal to study theology at the Grand Séminaire.

Priesthood
While in Montreal, Conaty was ordained a priest on December 21, 1872 by Bishop Ignace Bourget. He was ordained for the Diocese of Springfield in Massachusetts, where Bishop Patrick Thomas O'Reilly (a fellow native of County Cavan whose mother was named Mary Conaty) was a relative. Conaty's younger brother Bernard would also become a priest in 1882.

Following his return from Montreal, Conaty was appointed by Bishop O'Reilly to serve as his assistant at St. John's Church, Worcester, in January 1873. That same year, Conaty was first elected to the Worcester school board, serving for the next 14 years. He was also elected to two six-year terms on the board of the Worcester Public Library. Over a century later, Pope John Paul II would forbid priests from holding public office.

When St. John's was divided and Sacred Heart parish was established in January 1880, Conaty was named pastor of the new parish. A church was dedicated in September 1884, and Conaty also built a school, rectory, convent, and gymnasium. When his tenure at Sacred Heart ended in 1897, Conaty was succeeded as pastor by his brother Bernard, who had previously been rector of St. Michael's Cathedral.

In addition to his pastoral duties, Conaty was active in the temperance movement. He organized a diocesan chapter of the Catholic Total Abstinence Union of America in Springfield and became its first president in 1877. He eventually rose to become national president of the Total Abstinence Union, serving from 1888 to 1889. Conaty was also involved in the causes of Irish nationalism, serving as an officer in the Irish National Land League in the United States and state treasurer of the Irish National League of Massachusetts. His growing national profile led him to receive an honorary doctorate from Georgetown University during its centennial year in 1889.

Conaty became best known, however, for his work in Catholic education. In 1892, he became the first president of the Catholic Summer School of America. Meeting first at New London, Connecticut, and then at Plattsburgh, New York, the summer school provided an educational and social atmosphere that became a nationally known destination for Catholic families, high-ranking clergy, distinguished lecturers, and prominent politicians. In 1896, Conaty established dormitories, a dining hall, and an administration building while registering thousands of individuals from the United States and Canada.

Rector and bishop
In September 1896, Bishop John J. Keane was removed as rector of the Catholic University of America by Pope Leo XIII due to his liberal-leaning policies. The situation caused significant controversy, even leading to rumors that Cardinal James Gibbons, the university's chancellor, and Archbishop John Ireland, a trustee, would be removed from their positions as well. At a meeting on October 21, 1896, the Board of Trustees selected three names for rector to send to Rome: Conaty; Rev. Daniel J. Riordan of Chicago, brother of Archbishop Patrick William Riordan; and Rev. Joseph F. Mooney, vicar general of the Archdiocese of New York.

The papal documents appointing Conaty as the university's rector were dated November 23, 1896 and arrived in Washington, D.C. on the following December 8. Conaty was installed by Cardinal Gibbons on January 19, 1897. In light of the ideological infighting at the university, the biggest advantage in Conaty's favor was that he was neither an outspoken liberal nor conservative and was acceptable to both sides. During the Spanish–American War, Conaty provided academic accommodations for students who volunteered for military service, allowing them an additional year to complete their degrees after their service. In 1900, the university became a charter member of the Association of American Universities. In June that year, Conaty welcomed a visit from President William McKinley; noting the university's acceptance of Black students, he told McKinley that the university, "like the Catholic Church...knows no race line and no color line."

However, Conaty's administration was plagued by personnel issues and financial difficulties. Some of the faculty and trustees demanded the dismissal of the conservative-minded professor of dogmatic theology, Rev. Joseph Schroeder, who they believed had a role in Bishop Keane's removal. In October 1897, Conaty asked the Board of Trustees to remove Schroeder in order to restore peace among the faculty; after a heated discussion between liberal and conservative members, the board decided to directly refer the issue to the pope but still recommended that Schroeder be removed. Leo XIII ultimately settled the case by transferring Schroeder to the University of Münster in December 1897. Meanwhile, financial issues arose after the 1897-1898 school year left the university with a balance of only $3,000. In November 1901, the Board of Trustees appointed a special committee to investigate the university's finances, concluding in April 1902 that "in the management of the university funds there has been not only a lack of business method and of competency, but an almost culpable negligence."

Episcopal consecration
At the time of Conaty's appointment as rector, Cardinal Mariano Rampolla wrote to Cardinal Gibbons to say the pope was agreeable to bestowing an ecclesiastical honor upon Conaty "in order to add dignity to the office." In April 1897, Gibbons suggested making Conaty a bishop but Rampolla replied that it was too soon to elevate him to that rank. Instead, Conaty was named a domestic prelate with the title of Monsignor in June 1897.

Four years later, while still serving as rector, Conaty was given the honorary position of titular bishop of Samos by Leo XIII on October 5, 1901. He received his episcopal consecration on the following November 24 from Cardinal Gibbons, with Bishops Camillus Paul Maes and Thomas Daniel Beaven serving as co-consecrators, at the Cathedral of the Assumption in Baltimore.

Bishop of Monterey-Los Angeles
As discontent grew with the university's management among faculty and trustees, talk turned toward replacing Conaty once his term expired. Rev. Denis J. O'Connell, the former rector of the Pontifical North American College in Rome, soon emerged as the leading candidate to succeed Conaty. To find a suitable provision for Conaty before O'Connell's appointment, Archbishop Patrick William Riordan of San Francisco (a university trustee) suggested Conaty for the vacant Diocese of Monterey-Los Angeles in California. Despite opposition from some California priests to having an East Coast bishop, Conaty was appointed Bishop of Monterey-Los Angeles on March 27, 1903.

Conaty formally took charge of the diocese on June 18, 1903, when he was installed at the Cathedral of Saint Vibiana. His 12 years as bishop was a period of growth for the diocese. At the beginning of his tenure in 1903, the diocese contained 101 priests, 121 churches, and 19 parochial schools to serve a Catholic population of 58,000. In his final year as bishop in 1915, there were 260 priests, 266 churches, 40 parochial schools, and 139,480 Catholics.

True to his background in education, Conaty established a Board of Examiners in 1903 to inspect the diocese's schools, and he also developed the diocese's first educational plan to provide Catholic schooling from kindergarten through college. To accommodate the growing Catholic population and replace St. Vibiana's Cathedral, Conaty purchased land for a new cathedral but an economic downturn in 1907 forced an end to the project.

Two weeks before his death, Conaty went to Coronado in the hope that the change would improve his failing health. While there he was visited by former President William Howard Taft. Conaty died in Coronado on September 18, 1915, at age 68.

References

Sources
 

1847 births
1915 deaths
20th-century Roman Catholic bishops in the United States
American Roman Catholic clergy of Irish descent
People from County Cavan
Irish emigrants to the United States (before 1923)
Roman Catholic Archdiocese of Los Angeles
Roman Catholic Diocese of Monterey in California
Presidents of the Catholic University of America
Burials at the Cathedral of Our Lady of the Angels